Ballerina is an upcoming American action thriller film directed by Len Wiseman from a screenplay by Shay Hatten and Emerald Fennell, based on a story by Hatten. The film is intended to be a spin-off of the John Wick franchise and the fifth installment thereof. It stars Ana de Armas as Rooney, a ballerina-assassin previously portrayed by Unity Phelan in John Wick: Chapter 3 – Parabellum (2019), with Ian McShane, Keanu Reeves, Lance Reddick, and Anjelica Huston reprising their roles from previous films. Principal photography began in November 2022, in Prague.

Premise
Taking place between the events of John Wick: Chapter 3 – Parabellum and Chapter 4, ballerina-assassin Rooney hunts the murderers of her family.

Cast
 Ana de Armas as Rooney: A ballerina who seeks revenge by hunting the murderers of her family. The character was previously portrayed by Unity Phelan in John Wick: Chapter 3 – Parabellum (2019).
 Ian McShane as Winston Scott: The enigmatic owner of the Continental Hotel.
 Keanu Reeves as Jardani Jovonovich / Johnathan "John" Wick: A professional hitman known as one of the most dangerous assassins, and fearfully referred to in the hitman underworld as "Baba Yaga".
 Lance Reddick as Charon, the concierge at the Continental Hotel in New York. This was Reddick’s final appearance as Charon and one of his last screen appearences.
 Anjelica Huston as "The Director"

Additionally, Gabriel Byrne, Norman Reedus, and Catalina Sandino Moreno have been cast in undisclosed roles.

Production

Development
In July 2017, Lionsgate Films acquired Shay Hatten's action thriller Ballerina, with Thunder Road Films producing the film with Hatten rewriting the script to be a part of the John Wick franchise, with the title character, Rooney, ultimately being written into the third main film, John Wick: Chapter 3 – Parabellum in a cameo role ahead of the production of Ballerina, portrayed by Unity Phelan. By October 2019, Len Wiseman was hired to direct the film. In May 2020, Stahelski stated that Wiseman had read the script earlier, and approached the studio with a pitch of how he would develop the project, based on Hatten's draft, for which the proof of concept had previously been uploaded to YouTube in September 2017. Stahelski met with Wiseman, and approached executives to hire the filmmaker. He confirmed that he and his team will work closely with Wiseman on the action sequences and stunts for the film, while acknowledging that Wiseman's filmmaking style will add variety to the franchise. At that point, Wiseman and Hatten were working on a newer draft of the script. By April 2022, the film was officially announced by Lionsgate.

In July 2022, de Armas revealed that she had personally selected Emerald Fennell to contribute to the script as one of its writers.

Casting
In May 2020, it was reported that the studio was looking for an actress to star in the film, with Chloë Grace Moretz as the template for the kind of talent they were looking for. By October 2021, Ana de Armas entered negotiations to play the titular character, a ballerina-assassin named Rooney, replacing Unity Phelan, who previously portrayed the character in John Wick: Chapter 3 – Parabellum (2019). By April 2022 at CinemaCon, Lionsgate officially announced that de Armas would star in the lead role. In November 2022, it was announced that Keanu Reeves, Ian McShane, Lance Reddick, and Anjelica Huston had joined the cast and will reprise their roles from previous films of the franchise; as Jardani Jovonovich / John Wick, Winston Scott, Charon, and "the Director", respectively. In December 2022, Gabriel Byrne, Norman Reedus,  and Catalina Sandino Moreno joined the supporting cast in undisclosed roles.

Filming
Principal photography was initially scheduled to commence in summer 2022. Filming officially began on November 7, 2022, in Prague. It was in post-production in February 2023.

References

External links
 

Upcoming films
American action thriller films
Film spin-offs
Films directed by Len Wiseman
Films produced by Basil Iwanyk
Films shot in Prague
Films with screenplays by Shay Hatten
John Wick
Lionsgate films
Summit Entertainment films
Thunder Road Films films
Upcoming English-language films